In mathematics, the Hausdorff moment problem, named after Felix Hausdorff, asks for necessary and sufficient conditions that a given sequence  be the sequence of moments

of some Borel measure  supported on the closed unit interval .

The essential difference between this and other well-known moment problems is that this is on a bounded interval, whereas in the Stieltjes moment problem one considers a half-line , and in the Hamburger moment problem one considers the whole line . The Stieltjes moment problems and the Hamburger moment problems, if they are solvable,  may have infinitely many solutions (indeterminate moment problem) whereas a Hausdorff moment problem always has a unique solution if it is solvable (determinate moment problem). In the indeterminate moment problem case, there are infinite measures corresponding to the same prescribed moments and they consist of a convex set. The set of polynomials may or may not be dense in the associated Hilbert spaces if the moment problem is indeterminate, and it depends on whether measure is extremal or not. But in the determinate moment problem case, the set of  polynomials is dense in the associated Hilbert space.

Completely monotonic sequences 
In 1921, Hausdorff showed that  is such a moment sequence if and only if the sequence is completely monotonic, that is, its difference sequences satisfy the equation

for all . Here,  is the difference operator given by

The necessity of this condition is easily seen by the identity

which is non-negative since it is the integral of a non-negative function. For example, it is necessary to have

See also
 Total monotonicity

References
 Hausdorff, F. "Summationsmethoden und Momentfolgen. I." Mathematische Zeitschrift 9, 74–109, 1921.
 Hausdorff, F. "Summationsmethoden und Momentfolgen. II." Mathematische Zeitschrift 9, 280–299, 1921.
 Feller, W. "An Introduction to Probability Theory and Its Applications", volume II, John Wiley & Sons, 1971.
 Shohat, J.A.; Tamarkin, J. D. The Problem of Moments, American mathematical society, New York, 1943.

Probability problems
Moment (mathematics)
Mathematical problems